Taste receptor type 2 member 1 (TAS2R1/T2R1) is a protein that in humans is encoded by the TAS2R1 gene. It belongs to the G protein-coupled receptor (GPCR) family and is related to class A-like GPCRs, they contain 7 transmembrane helix bundles and short N-terminus loop.  Furthermore, TAS2R1 is member of the 25 known human bitter taste receptors, which enable the perception of bitter taste in the mouth cavity. Increasing evidence indicates a functional role of TAS2Rs in extra-oral tissues.

Expression and function

Extra-oral roles of TAS2Rs 
Bitter taste receptors are expressed in taste receptor cells, which organized into taste buds on the papillae of the tongue and palate epithelium.

In addition, TAS2Rs were found to be expressed in extra-oral tissues, e.g. brain, lungs, gastrointestinal tract, etc. So far, less is known about their function however, for example it was shown that:

 TAS2Rs mediate relaxation of airway smooth muscles.
 TAS2R43 is involved in secretion of gastric acid in the stomach.

Extra-oral roles of TAS2R1 

 TAS2R1, TAS2R4, TAS2R10, TAS2R38 and TAS2R49 were found to be down-regulated in breast cancer cells.
 TAS2R1, causes vasoconstrictor responses in the pulmonary circuit and relaxation in the airways.

Structure of TAS2R1 receptor 
Based on a recent homology model from BitterDB several conserved motifs, which are counterparts to Class A GPCRs were found:

 Transmembrane helix 1: N1.50xxI1.53
 Transmembrane helix 2: L2.46xxxR2.50
 Transmembrane helix 3: F3.49Y3.50xxK3.53
 Transmembrane helix 5: P5.50
 Transmembrane helix 6: F6.44xxxY6.46
 Transmembrane helix 7: H7.49S7.50xxL7.53

Numbering is according to the Balleros-Weinstein system.

Unlike in Class A GPCRs, in transmembrane helix 4 no DRY motif was found as well as position 6.50 is not conserved.

TAS2R1 gene 
This gene encodes a member of a family of candidate taste receptors that are members of the G protein-coupled receptor superfamily and that are specifically expressed by taste receptor cells of the tongue and palate epithelia. This intronless taste receptor gene encodes a 7-transmembrane receptor protein, functioning as a bitter taste receptor.

SNPs 
In T2R1 two SNPs are known in R111H and R206W (dbSNP).

Transcription Factors 
So far, AML1a, AP-1, AREB6, FOXL1, IRF-7A, Lmo2, NF-E2, NF-E2 p45 were found as the top transcription factor binding sites by QIAGEN in the TAS2R1 gene promoter.

Mutagenesis data 
Several mutations have been shown to influence binding of a ligand to TAS2R1 (based on BitterDB):

Ligands 
Up to now, 39 ligands for T2R1 were identified in BitterDB, among them L-amino acids, peptides, humulones, small molecules etc.

See also
 Taste receptor

References

Further reading

Human taste receptors